Hoseynabad (also Romanized as Ḩoseynābād; also known as Ḩasanābād) is a village in Fathabad Rural District, in the Central District of Khatam County, Yazd Province, Iran. At the 2006 census, its population was 45, in 13 families.

References 

Populated places in Khatam County